Taraškievica or Belarusian Classical Orthography is a variant of orthography of the Belarusian language, based on the literary norm of the modern Belarusian language, the first normalization of which was made by Branislaŭ Taraškievič in 1918, and was in official use in Belarus until the Belarusian orthography reform of 1933. Since 1933, Taraškievica has been used informally in Belarus and by the Belarusian diaspora abroad. In a more common sense Taraškievica is sometimes considered to be a linguistic norm.

The name Taraškievica (Tarashkyevitsa) is intended to emphasize the similarity of the orthography to the work of Branislaŭ Taraškievič and may have appeared before World War II.

Around 1994, an alias, Classical Orthography, was introduced by Vincuk Viačorka, the promoter and author of the modern codification of the Taraškievica.

In 2005, with the publishing of the Belarusian Classical Orthography, the modern normalization of Taraškievica was made. In 2007 the Internet Assigned Numbers Authority assigned Taraškievica its own variant subtag "tarask" (full language tag of Belarusian in the Classical orthography is "be-tarask").

History

In 1918, prior to Belarus declaring independence, a desire for standardising the writing of Belarusian appeared. Several leading linguists made proposals:
 "Biełaruskaja hramatyka dla škoł" by Branislaŭ Taraškievič—the first edition used Łacinka (the Latin alphabet), and a Cyrillic variant soon followed
 "Hramatyka biełaruskaj mowy" by Balaslaŭ Pačopka
 "Biełaruski prawapis" by Anton Luckievič and Jan Stankievič
 "Prosty sposab stаcca u karotkim časie hrаmatnym" by Rudolf Abicht and Jan Stankievič

Eventually, Taraškievič's proposal was considered preferable. This was for a number of reasons: Taraškievič's orthography was the most well-grounded; it covered the majority of orthographic collisions; it built upon the previous Belarusian orthography; exercises for teaching purposes were included; and it was sponsored by Belarusian political leaders of the time.

The work of Taraškievič provided the definitive model for the main features of Belarusian. All later proposals and reforms of the Belarusian language have been based on his codification.

Reform proposals and Belarusian orthography reform of 1933
In 1926 in Minsk an international conference on the reform of the Belarusian orthography was held, where some orthography issues were discussed. In 1927 a Linguistic Committee was formed which consisted of the Belarusian academicians and linguists, which worked on the problems of the Belarusian language and mainly developed the orthography norm by Taraškievič. In 1929 with the end of Belarusification the work of the committee was stopped. Despite this the results of its work was published in 1930.

In 1930 a group of scientists from the Belarusian Linguistic Institute started working on another proposal of Belarusian orthography reform. The authors of the proposal declared rejection of the ideas of "national democracy", which were, according to their beliefs, the base of the work by Linguistic Committee in 1927–1929. As a result, the group in 1933 proposed a deep revision of the Belarusian language, but kept the ideas of Taraškievič for loanwords in Belarusian and almost entirely reproduced the results of 1930 proposal.

Despite this, the proposal was rejected by the USSR authorities because of too low loyalty of approaching of the Belarusian language to Russian. On 5 May 1933 Central Committee of the Communist Party of the BSSR formed a special Political Committee for revision of the Russian-Belarusian dictionary and new orthography rules of the Belarusian language. The Committee primarily consisted of politicians, and no linguist was included in it.

On 21 July 1933 a decree of the Bureau of the Central Committee of the Communist Party of the BSSR was published which stated the end of the work on the Belarusian language reform. On 27 August 1933 the proposal was approved by the decree of the Belarusian Central Committee of the Communist Party without any public discussion.

The Belarusian orthography reform of 1933 adopted all the changes of the Academical 1933 proposal which approached the Belarusian language to Russian. The reform introduced both phonetic and morphological changes, as well as vocabulary of Belarusian, where the words with no direct equivalents in the Russian language were excluded and some Russian words introduced. After the reform the manuscripts of the ready academic Belarusian dictionaries were destroyed.

As a result of Belarusian orthography reform of 1933 more than 30 phonetic and morphological features of the Russian language were introduced in Belarusian.

After 1933
The legitimacy of the reform of grammar in 1933 was never adopted by certain political groups in West Belarus, unlike, e.g., KPZB, neither by the emigrants, who left Belarus after 1944. This rejection was made an issue of ideology, and presented as anti-Russification. One of the most vocal critics was Jan Stankievič, beginning with his 1936 publication.

However, rejecting all post-1933 official developments, the community was left with all the problems of the pre-1933 grammar virtually unaddressed and effectively with no unified grammar to use.

After the 1930s Taraškievica was primarily used by the Belarusian diaspora abroad. The only wide-scale use of the pre-1933 grammar on the territory of Belarus after the 1930s took place during the German occupation of Belarus in 1941–1944.

Today
During the perestroika period of the late 1980s, the movement for the return of Taraškievica in Belarus was initiated. At the beginning of the 1990s Taraškievica was used in Belarus along with the so-called “Narkamaŭka,” the official variant of Belarusian. On 14 June 1992 a conference of journalists and publishers who used the Classical orthography was held in Vilnius.

To solve the problem of standardization the Orthography Improvement Committee was created. The Committee worked in 1991–1992 and in 1993 published its proposals for orthographic changes.

In 2005 to standardize Taraškievica a working group of four people (consisting of Juraś Bušlakoŭ, Vincuk Viačorka, Źmicier Sańko and Zmicier Saŭka) work proposed codification of Taraškievica called Belarusian Classical Orthography as a result of intensive discussions and several years'. This proposal was adopted by major Taraškievica-using media, including the newspaper Nasha Niva, Belarusian ARCHE magazine, the Belarusian editions of Radio Free Europe and Radio Polonia. As well, this variant of orthography became preferable for use in the Belarusian Wikipedia in Taraškievica orthography (:be-tarask:)

On 27 April 2007 the Internet Assigned Numbers Authority assigned variant subtag "tarask" to Taraškievica. The full language tag of Belarusian in the Classical orthography is "be-tarask".  As a language code of the Belarusian Wikipedia in Taraškievica orthography it was adopted, however, in September 2015, over 8 years after IANA decision. Previously (since March 2007 split-off of orthographical versions of Belarusian Wikipedia), "be-x-old" code was used.

Differences between Taraškievica and the official orthography

Phonetics and spelling

Morphology 

According to E. Potekhina, general changes in the declension system of nouns are possible to Taraškievica, i.e. active reducing of grammar interchanges and their accurate definition as continuation of the unification process of declension types by gender signs. Besides this, single cases of paradigm change for single lexemes occur. Potekhina notes, that the reason for this is the reorientation of literary language norms from the middle dialects of the Belarusian language to the West-Belarusian, that are less influenced by the Russian language, i.e. "to a greater extent Belarusian". Per Potekhina, the factor or language contacts in the borderlands is not taken into account for this process.

Syntax 
The differences mainly affect government of prepositions.

Lexicology 

The differences in lexicology are an evaluation of particular lexical items that are used in special cases; in general case these differences depend on the vocabulary chosen to be used by a speaker. Choice of the orthography does not play a considerable part for this, and the differences shown below might be used by the speakers in the wide sense independently of the chosen orthography.

See also
 Belarusian orthography reform of 1933
 Narkamauka
 Trasianka

References

External links

  Online copy of Belarusian Classical Orthography book
 1968: Grammatical Changes in Modern Literary Belarusian Language by Professor R. G. A. de Bray
 Naša Niva dictionary (Classical orthography) // Naša Niva, 2001.
  Textbook Speak Belarusian to me. The base course of the classic Belarusian language.

Belarusian language
Belarusian orthography